One alpine skier from Mexico competed at the 1984 Winter Olympics in Sarajevo, Yugoslavia.  It was the first time since 1928 that an athlete from Mexico competed at the Winter Games.

Alpine skiing

Men

References

 Official Olympic Reports

Nations at the 1984 Winter Olympics
1984
1984 in Mexican sports